Keila-Joa Airfield was an airfield in Harju County, Estonia.

The airfield was built in the 1920s. During WWII, the airfield was used by the Luftwaffe. During the Soviet era, the airfield was used by the Soviet Air Force. In the beginning of the 1990s, the airfield was abandoned.

References

External links
 Keila-Joa Airfield at Forgotten Airfields

Defunct airports in Estonia
Buildings and structures in Harju County
Soviet Air Force bases
Harku Parish